

Results
Arsenal's score comes first

Football League Second Division

Final League table

FA Cup

References

1900-01
English football clubs 1900–01 season